Timon is a masculine given name and a surname which may refer to:

People
 Timon of Athens (person), 5th-century Athenian and legendary misanthrope
 Timon of Phlius (c. 320 BCE – c. 235 BCE), a Pyrrhonist philosopher of Ptolemaic Egypt and Hellenistic Greece
 Timon the Deacon, an early Christian leader
 Timon of Chaeronea, brother of Plutarch
 Timon Dobias (born 1989), Slovak footballer
 Timon Gremmels (born 1976), German politician
 Timon Haugan (born 1996), Norwegian alpine skier
 Timon Parris (born 1995), American football player
 Timon Screech, British art historian
 Timon Wellenreuther (born 1995), German football goalkeeper
 John Timon (1797–1867), first Roman Catholic Bishop of Buffalo, New York
 Juan José Timón (1937–2001), Uruguayan Olympic cyclist

Fictional characters
 the title character of Timon of Athens, a play by William Shakespeare
 the title character of The History of Timon of Athens the Man-hater, a rewrite of Shakespeare's original play by Thomas Shadwell
 Timon, a film and television character, originally from the film The Lion King
 Timon (Rome character), in the 2005 television series Rome

See also
 Tymon, name
 Timmons, name
 Chris Timons (born 1974), English footballer

Masculine given names